Pagachi-ye Bahmai (also Romanized as Pāgachī-ye Bahma’ī; also known as Pā Gachī and Pā Gachī Bahman) is a village in Howmeh-ye Sharqi Rural District, in the Central District of Ramhormoz County, Khuzestan Province, Iran. At the 2006 census, its population was 1,614, in 330 families.

References 

Populated places in Ramhormoz County